Carabus auratus, the golden ground beetle, is a species of ground beetle in the genus Carabus. This species is native to central and western Europe and has been introduced into North America.

Description
The flightless beetle reaches a body length between 1.7 and 2.0 cm. The elytra, each marked with three broad longitudinal grooves, are an iridescent gold-green colour, as are the head and thorax. The legs, antennae and mouth parts are orange.

C. auratus is found in fields and amongst bushes, particularly on loamy soil. On occasion, it climbs into trees. Active during the day, it preys upon insects, snails, and worms, which it seizes with its mandibles and sprays with a digestive secretion before consuming it. C. auratus can be welcome to farmers and gardeners, as it feeds upon pests such as the Colorado potato beetle.

The larvae hunt only at dawn. They moult three times before pupating in the soil and then emerging as adults in the autumn. The beetles' life expectancy is around two years; they overwinter under the shelter of stones or moss.

Subspecies 

 Carabus auratus auratus Linnaeus, 1761
 Carabus auratus honnoratii Dejean, 1826
 Carabus auratus lasserrei Doué, 1855
 Carabus auratus lotharingus Dejean, 1826
 Carabus auratus piolitensis J.P.Thélot & G.Thélot, 2019

References 

auratus
Beetles of Europe
Beetles described in 1761
Taxa named by Carl Linnaeus